The 2005 Bandy World Championship was played between 11 men's national bandy teams in Russia on 30 January-6 February 2005. Sweden became champions.

Squads

Group A

Premier tour
 30 January
 11.00  –  2–2 (6–4 after penalties)
 14.00  –  6–2
 19.00  –  19–1
 31 January
 11.00  –  19–1
 14.00  –  2–20
 19.00  –  2–6
 1 February
 11.00  –  7–5
 14.00  –  0–15
 19.00  –  0–22
 2 February
 11.00  –  1–17
 14.00  –  3–11
 19.00  –  5–3
 4 February
 11.00  –  7–2
 14.00  –  2–14
 19.00  –  7–5

Final Tour

Semifinals
 5 February
 16.00 Semifinal –  –  10–3
 19.00 Semifinal –  – , 6–2

Match for 3rd place
 6 February
 11.00  –  3–5

Final
 6 February
 16.00  –  2–5

Group B

Premier tour
 30 January
 10.00  –  2–9
 13.00  –  6–1
 31 January
 10.00  –  5–18
 13.00  –  1–8
 February 1
 10.00  –  18–0
 13.00  –  4–5
 February 2
 10.00  –  9–1
 13.00  –  18–1
 February 4
 10.00  –  2–10
 13.00  –  4–4 (6–7 after penalties)

Play off matches

Match for 4th Place
 February 5
 10.00  –  2–3

Match for 2nd Place
 February 5
 13.00  –  12–3

A-group qualification match
 February 5
  –  6–3

References

2005
World Championship
2005 in Russian sport
World Championship,2005
January 2005 sports events in Europe
February 2005 sports events in Europe